Tognazzi is a surname. Notable people with the surname include:

Gianmarco Tognazzi (born 1967), Italian actor
Maria Sole Tognazzi (born 1971), Italian film director
Ricky Tognazzi (born 1955), Italian actor and film director
Ugo Tognazzi (1922-1990), Italian film, television, and theater actor, director, and screenwriter

See also

Carlos Antognazzi
Luca Tognozzi
Tognazzini (name)